Candida viswanathii is a species of yeast in the genus Candida. It is named after the noted Indian pulmonologist, Raman Viswanathan.

References

Yeasts
viswanathii
Fungi described in 1962